A Trap is a 1997 Polish comedy film directed by Adek Drabiński. It was entered into the 20th Moscow International Film Festival.

Cast
 Marek Kondrat as Maciek Adamski
 Joanna Benda as Ewka
 Bogusław Linda as Aleksander Szuster
 Zbigniew Zamachowski as Robert 'Bobek' Burski
 Anita Lipnicka as Canary
 Dorota Pomykała as Iwona Babol
 Malgorzata Potocka as TV journalist
 Ewa Salacka as Journalist
 Jerzy Bończak as Bartender Lesio
 Zygmunt Malanowicz as Pianist
 Leon Niemczyk as Police Chief
 Piotr Dejmek as Gas man Wladzio

References

External links
 

1997 films
1997 comedy films
1990s Polish-language films
Polish comedy films